Jungangno Station is a station of Daegu Metro Line 1 in Jung-gu, Daegu, South Korea. With its prime location at the heart of Daegu and its proximity to a major shopping district, it is the second-busiest station in the Daegu Metro, after Banwoldang Station, which is the only transfer point between the Line 1 and Line 2. Many facilities, including a branch of Kyobo Book Centre, movie theaters, and several large banks are in the vicinity.

This station served as the terminus point for Line 1 from November 26, 1997, to May 2, 1998. Despite its large foot traffic, the platforms for this station are narrower than other Line 1 stations. It is also connected to the Daehyun PriMall, an underground shopping center, giving it a much larger than normal access area.

In 2003, an arsonist set fire to a train stopped at Jungangno Station. The fire killed at least 198 people.

References

External links 
 
 Panoramic view
Cyber station information from Daegu Metropolitan Transit Corporation 

Jung District, Daegu
Railway stations opened in 1997
Daegu Metro stations